William Sturrock Maxwell (21 September 1876 – 14 July 1940) was a Scottish professional footballer and amateur cricketer.

He played for hometown club Arbroath, Dundee, Heart of Midlothian, Stoke, Sunderland, Third Lanark and Bristol City. He also gained one cap for the Scotland national team. He finished as the top scorer in the Scottish Football League Division One in the 1901–02 season, and later, while at Bristol City, he was the Second Division topscorer with 27 goals in the 1905–06 season. Maxwell later coached the Belgium national team.

Football career 
Maxwell was born in Arbroath and began his career as an amateur playing for Hearts Strollers, Arbroath, Heart of Midlothian and Dundee whilst working as a solicitor's clerk. He was persuaded by Stoke manager Bill Rowley to become professional and he did so joining the Potters in the summer of 1895. Maxwell scored on his Stoke debut on the opening day of the 1895–96 season, in a 2–0 win over Bolton Wanderers. He initially had to bide his time as fellow Scottish forwards Billy Dickson and Tommy Hyslop were established in the first team. Following the departure of both Dickson and Hyslop in the summer of 1896 Maxwell became Stoke's main attacking threat and he became the clubs first prolific goalscorer. He finished up as top goalscorer for five seasons in a row, hitting 16 in 1896–97, 11 in 1897–98, 19 in 1898–99, 11 in 1899–1900 and 16 in 1900–01. During that period he took part in the annual Home Scots v Anglo-Scots international trial on four occasions, and having scored in the March 1898 fixture he was selected to play for Scotland against England two weeks later in what would be his only full cap.

Maxwell was not a typical 1890s inside-forward as most relied on strength and power, he instead used his pace to sprint away from defenders and most of his goals came in one-on-one situations with the goalkeeper. Maxwell helped Stoke reach their first FA Cup semi-final in 1899 where he scored Stoke's only goal in a 3–1 defeat against Derby County. Maxwell was renowned for his gentlemanly conduct on the pitch but on one occasion playing against West Bromwich Albion in October 1899 he lost his temper with Albion's Abraham Jones and the pair traded blows and were both sent-off. Maxwell received a two-week suspension during with time he played in a benefit match for Sheffield United's Arthur Watson. He suffered a serious knee injury in that match and missed a further ten weeks.

With his injury Stoke decided to cash in on him, selling him to Third Lanark for £250, which turned out to be poor business as Stoke failed to find a suitable replacement and later suffered heavy financial problems. After a year back in Scotland, in which he scored 12 goals in 19 appearances (10 in Scottish Division One, the season's record total) and played for the Scottish Football League XI, he moved to Sunderland, and then to Millwall Athletic where he scored 34 goals in 54 Southern League games. His final move of his career took him to Bristol City where he enjoyed great success, scoring 27 goals in 1905–06 as the Robins won the Second Division title. He then hit 19 goals in 1906–07 as they nearly won the First Division title missing out by three points to Newcastle United.

Maxwell retired in 1909 and decided to move to Belgium to take up a coaching role with the Belgium national team.

Cricket career
Outside of football, Maxwell played a single cricket match for Staffordshire in the 1904 Minor Counties Championship against Dorset. In Staffordshires' first innings, he was dismissed for 4 runs by Hubert Greenhill, becoming one of Greenhill's 8 victims in the innings. In their second innings, he opened the batting, scoring 18 unbeaten runs.

Career statistics

Club
Source:

International
Source:

Honours

Player 
Bristol City
Football League Second Division champion: 1905–06
 Football League First Division runner-up: 1906–07

Manager 
Belgium
Summer Olympics Gold medalist: 1920

KV Mechelen
Belgian First Division runner-up: 1930–31 

Cercle Brugge
Belgian Second Division champion: 1937–38

References

External links 
 
 William Maxwell coach-profile at EU-Football.info

1876 births
1940 deaths
Arbroath F.C. players
Belgium national football team managers
Bristol City F.C. players
Cercle Brugge K.S.V. managers
Dundee F.C. players
Heart of Midlothian F.C. players
Millwall F.C. players
People from Arbroath
Scotland international footballers
Scottish cricketers
Scottish Football League players
Southern Football League players
Scottish Football League representative players
Scottish football managers
Scottish footballers
Staffordshire cricketers
Stoke City F.C. players
Sunderland A.F.C. players
English Football League players
Third Lanark A.C. players
Scottish league football top scorers
Scottish expatriate football managers
Scottish expatriates in Belgium
Expatriate football managers in Belgium
Association football forwards
Footballers from Angus, Scotland
Léopold FC players
Olympic coaches